István Szekér (born 25 December 1970) is a Hungarian former professional footballer who played as a defender.

References 
 Profile at HLSZ
 {{Worldfootball.net|istvan-szeker

1970 births
Living people
People from Várpalota
Sportspeople from Veszprém County
Hungarian footballers
Association football defenders
Eredivisie players
Belgian Pro League players
Szombathelyi Haladás footballers
Willem II (football club) players
MTK Budapest FC players
Budapest Honvéd FC players
K.F.C. Verbroedering Geel players
SV Mattersburg players
Dunaújváros FC players
Hungarian expatriate footballers
Hungarian expatriate sportspeople in the Netherlands
Expatriate footballers in the Netherlands
Hungarian expatriate sportspeople in Austria
Expatriate footballers in Austria